Pseudexechia is a genus of flies belonging to the family Mycetophilidae.

The species of this genus are found in Europe, Japan and Northern America.

Species:
 Pseudexechia altaica Zaitzev, 1988 
 Pseudexechia aurivernica Chandler, 1978

References

Mycetophilidae